The Nova SuperSport Cup was an association football friendly tournament competition hosted by Greek premium sports network Nova Sports between 1999 and 2001, held in Athens.

The first tournament occurred from 31 July to 1 August 1999 with the participation of English Premier League club Leicester City, Hertha Berlin from the Bundesliga, Iraklis from the Alpha Ethniki and AEK Athens from the Alpha Ethniki, which eventually won the tournament.
The second tournament occurred between 4 and 5 August 2000 with the participation of Greek Alpha Ethniki club AEK Athens, Werder Bremen from the Bundesliga, Rapid Wien from the Austrian Bundesliga and Brescia from the Serie A, which eventually won the tournament. The third and last tournament occurred on 3 August 2001 with the participation of Greek Alpha Ethniki club AEK Athens, Sevilla from the La Liga and Bologna from the Serie A, which eventually won the tournament.

Venue

All the games were played at the Nikos Goumas Stadium a 27,729 seat multi-use venue, home ground of hosts AEK Athens. The ground has been demolished in June 2003.

Results

References

Bibliography 
 Συλλογικό έργο (2014). 90 ΧΡΟΝΙΑ, Η ΙΣΤΟΡΙΑ ΤΗΣ ΑΕΚ . Αθήνα, Ελλάδα: Εκδοτικός Οίκος Α. Α. Λιβάνη. .
 Παναγιωτακόπουλος, Παναγιώτης (2021). 1963-2021 ΤΟ ΤΑΞΙΔΙ ΣΥΝΕΧΙΖΕΤΑΙ . Αθήνα, Ελλάδα: .
 Παναγιωτακόπουλος, Παναγιώτης (2022). 1979-2003 ΤΟ ΤΑΞΙΔΙ ΣΥΝΕΧΙΖΕΤΑΙ...Νο2 . Αθήνα, Ελλάδα: .

External links
 Supersport Tournament (Athinai) 1999-2001
 AEK Athens Fixtures of period 1999-2000
 AEK Athens Fixtures of period 2000-2001
 AEK Athens Fixtures of period 2001-2002
 SK Rapid Wien Fixtures of period 2000-2001
  Supersport-Turnier Athen 2000

1999 establishments in Greece
2000 establishments in Greece
2001 establishments in Greece